Kentucky elected its members August 4, 1806.

See also 
 United States House of Representatives elections, 1806 and 1807
 List of United States representatives from Kentucky

Notes 

1806
Kentucky
United States House of Representatives